The following is a select list of Edmonton Elks all-time records and statistics current to the 2021 CFL season.

Grey Cup championships

Won, as a player:
7 – Bill Stevenson - (-)
6 – Dave Cutler - (-)
6 – Dave Fennell - (-)
6 – Larry Highbaugh - (-)
6 – Dan Kepley - (-)
6 – Dale Potter - (-)
6 – Tom Towns - (-)

Grey Cup games played in:
9 – Dave Cutler - (-, -)
9 – Larry Highbaugh - (-, -)
8 – Ron Estay - (-, -)
8 – Bob Howes - (-, -)
8 – Tom Wilkinson - (-, -)
8 – Dave Fennell - (-, -)
8 – Dale Potter - (-, -)
8 – Bill Stevenson - (-)

Won, as a Head Coach:
5 – Hugh Campbell - (-)
3 – Pop Ivy - (-)

Grey Cup appearances for a Head Coach:
6 – Hugh Campbell - (-)
3 – Pop Ivy - (-)
3 – Ray Jauch - (-)

Coaching 

Seasons
11 – William Deacon White
7 – Ray Jauch
7 – Ron Lancaster

Games
126 – Ron Lancaster
112 – Ray Jauch
96 – Hugh Campbell
96 – Neill Armstrong

Wins
83 – Ron Lancaster
70 – Hugh Campbell
65 – Ray Jauch

Best Winning Percentage (min. 30 games)
.781 – Pop Ivy
.755 – Hugh Campbell
.722 – Chris Jones

Losses
56 – Neill Armstrong
43 – Ray Jauch
43 – Ron Lancaster

Worst Winning Percentage (min. 30 games)
.398 – Neill Armstrong
.407 – Kavis Reed
.444 – Don Matthews
.444 – Richie Hall

Games played 
274 – Rod Connop
268 – Sean Fleming
254 - Dave Cutler

Scoring 

Most points – Career
2,571 – Sean Fleming
2,237 – Dave Cutler
756 – Sean Whyte
677 – Jackie Parker

Most Points – Season
224 – Jerry Kauric - 
207 – Sean Fleming - 
204 – Sean Fleming - 
195 – Dave Cutler - 

Most Points – Game
30 – Eric Blount – vs. Winnipeg Blue Bombers, Sept. 15, 1995
24 – Jim Germany - vs. Hamilton Tiger-Cats, Aug. 1, 1981
24 – Brian Kelly - vs. Ottawa Rough Riders, June 30, 1984
24 – Sean Fleming - @ BC Lions, Oct. 29, 1993
24 – Kez McCorvey - vs. Winnipeg Blue Bombers, July 21, 2000

Touchdowns 

Most Touchdowns – Career
97 – Brian Kelly
79 – Jackie Parker
77 – Norman Kwong

Most Touchdowns – Season
20 – Blake Marshall - 
19 – Jim Germany - 
18 – Brian Kelly - 

Most Touchdowns – Game
5 – Eric Blount - vs. Winnipeg Blue Bombers, Sept. 15, 1995
4 – Jim Germany - vs. Hamilton Tiger-Cats, Aug. 1, 1981
4 – Brian Kelly - vs. Ottawa Rough Riders, June 30, 1984
4 – Kez McCorvey - vs. Winnipeg Blue Bombers, July 21, 2000

Kicking 

Most Converts – Career
713 – Sean Fleming
627 – Dave Cutler
170 – Jerry Kauric

Most Converts – Season
70 – Jerry Kauric - 
64 – Ray Macoritti - 
63 – Sean Fleming - 

Most Converts - Game
9 – Sean Fleming - vs. Winnipeg Blue Bombers, Sept. 15, 1995
8 – Dave Cutler - vs. Montreal Alouettes, Sept. 26, 1981
8 – Dave Cutler - vs. Toronto Argonauts, Oct. 24, 1981

Most Field Goals – Career
553 – Sean Fleming
464 – Dave Cutler
195 – Sean Whyte

Most Field Goals – Season
50 – Dave Cutler - 
47 – Sean Fleming - 
47 – Sean Whyte - 
45 – Jerry Kauric - 
45 – Sean Fleming - 
45 – Sean Whyte - 

Most Field Goals – Game
7 – Sean Whyte - @ Winnipeg Blue Bombers, June 27, 2019
7 – Sean Whyte - vs. Winnipeg Blue Bombers, Aug. 23, 2019
6 – Dave Cutler - vs. Saskatchewan Roughriders, Oct. 22, 1972
6 – Jerry Kauric - vs. BC Lions, July 13, 1989
6 – Sean Fleming - @ BC Lions, Oct. 29, 1993
6 – Sean Fleming - @ BC Lions, Oct. 12, 1996
6 – Sean Fleming - vs. Montreal Alouettes, July 17, 1997
6 – Sean Whyte - vs. BC Lions, Oct. 17, 2015

Longest Field Goal
59 – Dave Cutler - @ Saskatchewan Roughriders, Oct. 28, 1970
58 – Bill Mitchell - @ Calgary Stampeders, Aug. 17, 1964
58 – Dave Cutler - @ Hamilton Tiger-Cats, Sept. 24, 1973
58 – Sean Fleming - @ Sacramento Gold Miners, July 31, 1993

Most Singles – Career
218 – Dave Cutler
199 – Sean Fleming
53 – Jerry Kauric

Most Singles – Season
33 – Tom Dixon - 
23 – Sean Fleming - 
22 – Sean Fleming - 
21 – Sean Fleming - 
20 – Damon Duval - 

Most Singles - Game
5 – Dave Cutler - vs. Toronto Argonauts, Oct. 28, 1983
4 – Sean Fleming - @ Winnipeg Blue Bombers, Oct. 12, 1997
4 – Sean Fleming - vs. BC Lions, Oct. 19, 1997
4 – Sean Fleming - vs. Saskatchewan Roughriders, Sept. 21, 2002
4 – Noel Prefontaine - vs. Calgary Stampeders, July 3, 2008

Punting 

Most Punts – Career
1,264 – Sean Fleming
755 – Glenn Harper
691 – Hank Ilesic

Most Punts – Season
156 – Glenn Harper - 
154 – Jerry Kauric - 
154 – Glenn Harper - 
146 – Sean Fleming - 

Most Punts – Game
15 – Tom Dixon - @ BC Lions, Sept. 19, 1986
15 – Glenn Harper - @ Hamilton Tiger-Cats, Sept. 17, 1993

Most Yards – Career
52,957 – Sean Fleming
31,857 – Hank Ilesic
31,018 – Glenn Harper

Most Yards – Season
6,718 – Jerry Kauric - 
6,554 – Glenn Harper - 
6,523 – Tom Dixon - 

Most Yards – Game
721 – Tom Dixon - @ BC Lions, Sept. 19, 1986
612 – Glenn Harper - @ Hamilton Tiger-Cats, Sept. 17, 1986

Longest Punt
91 – Sean Fleming - @ Saskatchewan Roughriders, Sept. 28, 1997
88 – Hank Ilesic - @ Calgary Stampeders, Sept. 19, 1981
87 – Fred Dunn - @ Calgary Stampeders, Sept. 6, 1971
87 – Hank Ilesic - vs. BC Lions, Sept, 17, 1977
87 – Hank Ilesic - @ Winnipeg Blue Bombers, July 18, 1978
87 – Ray Macoritti - @ Saskatchewan Roughriders, Aug. 19, 1990

Kickoffs 

Most Yards – Career
69,973 – Sean Fleming
46,134 – Dave Cutler
20,303 – Grant Shaw

Most Yards – Season
5,732 – Sean Fleming - 
5,640 – Sean Fleming - 
5,611 – Sean Fleming - 
5,555 – Noel Prefontaine - 
5,310 – Grant Shaw - 

Most Yards – Game
588 – Sean Fleming - @ BC Lions, Oct. 29, 1993
582 – Sean Fleming - vs. Toronto Argonauts, Aug. 9, 2003
578 – Sean Fleming - vs. Winnipeg Blue Bombers, Sept. 15, 1995
570 – Sean Fleming - vs. Ottawa Rough Riders, Aug. 27, 1995
562 – Dean Dorsey - @ BC Lions, Oct. 12, 1991
545 – Marco Cyncar - @ Ottawa Rough Riders, July 26, 1990

Longest Kickoff
95 – Dave Cutler - @ Winnipeg Blue Bombers, Aug. 6, 1975
95 – Tom Dixon - @ Calgary Stampeders, Sept. 1, 1986
95 – Sean Fleming - @ Calgary Stampeders, Sept. 7, 1998
95 – Sean Fleming - @ Saskatchewan Roughriders, Aug. 18, 2007
95 – Grant Shaw - vs. Ottawa Redblacks, July 9, 2015
95 – Grant Shaw - @ Saskatchewan Roughriders, Sept. 18, 2016

Passing

Most Passes Thrown – Career
4,827 – Ricky Ray
3,195 – Mike Reilly
2,433 – Tracy Ham

Most Passes Thrown – Season
715 – Ricky Ray - 
664 – Warren Moon - 
654 – Mike Reilly - 

Most Passes Thrown – Game
56 – Ricky Ray - vs. Toronto Argonauts, Aug. 20, 2005
54 – Trevor Harris - @ Winnipeg Blue Bombers, June 27, 2019
53 – Mike Reilly - @ Calgary Stampeders, Sept. 4, 2017

Most Completions – Career
3,225 – Ricky Ray
1,702 – Mike Reilly
1,382 – Tom Wilkinson

Most Completions – Season
479 – Ricky Ray - 
448 – Mike Reilly - 
447 – Mike Reilly - 
422 – Ricky Ray - 
418 – Mike Reilly - 
406 – Ricky Ray - 
401 – Ricky Ray - 
380 – Warren Moon - 

Most Completions – Game
40 – Ricky Ray - vs. Toronto Argonauts, Aug. 20, 2005
37 – Mike Reilly - @ Calgary Stampeders, Sept. 4, 2017
36 – Warren Moon - vs. Hamilton Tiger-Cats, Sept. 11, 1983
36 – Ricky Ray - @ Winnipeg Blue Bombers, Sept. 26, 2008

Most Consecutive Pass Completions
22 – Jason Maas - vs. Winnipeg Blue Bombers, July 30, 2004
17 – Stefan LeFors vs. Saskatchewan Roughriders, Oct. 26, 2007

Most Passing Yards – Career
40,531 – Ricky Ray
26,929 – Mike Reilly
21,228 – Warren Moon

Most Passing Yards – Season
5,830 – Mike Reilly - 
5,663 – Ricky Ray - 
5,648 – Warren Moon - 

Most Passing Yards – Game
555 – Warren Moon – vs. Montreal Concordes, Oct. 15, 1983
540 – Jason Maas - vs. Winnipeg Blue Bombers, July 30, 2004
522 – Warren Moon - vs. Hamilton Tiger-Cats, Sept. 11, 1983
511 – Mike Reilly - @ Toronto Argonauts, Aug. 18, 2013

Highest Pass Completion Percentage – Season (min. 300 attempts)70.77 – Mike Reilly - 
69.89 – Ricky Ray - 2007
69.75 – Ricky Ray - 2008
68.35 – Mike Reilly - 
67.57 – Ricky Ray - 2003Highest Pass Completion Percentage – Game (min. 20 attempts)92.00 – Ricky Ray - vs. Montreal Alouettes, Oct. 31, 2008 (23-25)
90.48 – Tom Wilkinson – vs. Ottawa Rough Riders, Aug. 19, 1974 (19-21)
90.00 – Jason Maas - vs. Winnipeg Blue Bombers, July 30, 2004 (27-30)

Highest Passing Efficiency Rating – Season
108.3 – Warren Moon - 
108.1 – Ricky Ray - 

Most Touchdowns – Career
210 – Ricky Ray
144 – Warren Moon
144 – Mike Reilly

Most Touchdowns – Season
36 – Warren Moon - 
36 – Tracy Ham - 
35 – Ricky Ray - 

Most Touchdowns – Game
5 – Warren Moon - vs. Montreal Alouettes, Oct. 15, 1983
5 – Tracy Ham - vs. Toronto Argonauts, Aug. 21, 1991
5 – Dan Crowley - vs. Winnipeg Blue Bombers, July 21, 2000
5 – Nealon Greene - @ Toronto Argonauts, Oct. 21, 2000
5 – Ricky Ray - vs. Hamilton Tiger-Cats, July 30, 2005
5 – Ricky Ray - vs. Winnipeg Blue Bombers, June 28, 2007
5 – Ricky Ray - vs. Montreal Alouettes, Sept. 14, 2007

Most Interceptions – Career
130 – Ricky Ray
126 – Tom Wilkinson
93 – Jackie Parker

Most Interceptions – Season
27 – Danny McManus - 
24 – Tracy Ham - 
24 – Ricky Ray - 

Most Interceptions – Game
6 – Lindy Berry - vs. Winnipeg Blue Bombers, Sept. 9, 1950
6 – Tom Maudlin - vs. Saskatchewan Roughriders, Sept. 7, 1963
6 – Charlie Fulton - @ Ottawa Rough Riders, Sept. 27, 1969
6 – Tracy Ham - @ Hamilton Tiger-Cats, Aug. 12, 1988
6 – Tracy Ham - @ Toronto Argonauts, July 27, 1989

Rushing

Most Rushing Yards – Career
9,966 – Johnny Bright
8,769 – Norman Kwong
6,160 – Jim Thomas

Most Rushing Yards – Season 
1,722 – Johnny Bright – 
1,679 – Johnny Bright – 
1,503 – Reggie Taylor – 
1,455 – Roy Bell - 1973
1,448 – John Avery – 2002
1,437 – Norman Kwong – 1956
1,377 – Mike Pringle - 2003
1,350 – Johnny Bright – 1961
1,341 – Roy Bell – 1974
1,340 – Johnny Bright – 1959
1,324 – Jim Germany - 1979
1,293 – Reggie Taylor – 1991
1,293 – Arkee Whitlock – 2009
1,268 – Johnny Bright – 1960
1,250 – Norman Kwong - 1955
1,141 – Mike Pringle – 2004
1,096 – Tracy Ham – 1990
1,091 – Eric Blount – 1996
1,063 - C. J. Gable – 2018
1,060 – Troy Davis – 2006
1,057 – Jerome Messam - 2011
1,050 – Norman Kwong - 1957
1,033 – Norman Kwong - 1958
1,022 – Troy Mills – 1999
1,019 – Jim Germany – 1980
1,006 – Roy Bell – 1975
1,006 – Jim Thomas – 1967
1,005 – Tracy Ham – 1989
1,004 – Jim Germany – 1977
1,001 - C. J. Gable – 2019

Most Rushing Yards – Game
225 – Sean Millington – vs. Saskatchewan Roughriders, Oct. 30, 1999
198 – Ron McClendon - @ Montreal Alouettes, Oct. 21, 2006
192 – Norman Kwong - vs. Calgary Stampeders, Oct. 29, 1955
192 – John White - vs. Saskatchewan Roughriders, Sept. 26, 2014

Longest Run
104 – Jim Thomas - vs. BC Lions, Oct. 9, 1965 (TD)
100 – Jim Thomas - @ Winnipeg Blue Bombers, Aug. 2, 1966 (TD)
97 – Jim Thomas - vs. Ottawa Rough Riders, Sept. 4, 1964 (TD)

Most Rushing Yards, Quarterback – Career
4,713 – Jackie Parker
4,438 – Tracy Ham
3,040 – Mike Reilly

Most Rushing Yards, Quarterback – Season
1,086 – Tracy Ham - 
1,005 – Tracy Ham - 
998 – Tracy Ham - 
920 – Damon Allen - 
878 – Nealon Greene - 

Most Rushing Yards, Quarterback – Game
180 – Nealon Greene - vs. Saskatchewan Roughriders, July 16, 1999
170 – Damon Allen - vs. BC Lions, Oct. 29, 1993
166 – Tracy Ham - @ Ottawa Rough Riders, Aug. 15, 1991

Most 100-Yard Games – Career
36 – Johnny Bright
19 – Norman Kwong
15 – Jim Thomas

Most 100-Yd Games – Season
9 – Johnny Bright - 
8 – Norman Kwong - 
8 – Johnny Bright - 

Most Consecutive 100-Yd Rushing Games Season
8 – Johnny Bright - 
4 – Norman Kwong - 
4 – John Avery - 
4 – Daniel Porter - 

Most 100-Yd Rushing Games, Quarterback, Season
3 – Jackie Parker - 
3 – Tracy Ham - 
2 – Matt Dunigan - 
2 – Tracy Ham - 
2 – Nealon Greene - 
2 – Nealon Greene - 
2 – Nealon Greene - 

Most Touchdowns – Career
73 – Norman Kwong
69 – Johnny Bright
65 – Jim Germany

Most Touchdowns – Season
18 – Jim Germany - 
16 – Johnny Bright - 
16 – Blake Marshall - 

Most Touchdowns – Game
4 – Jim Germany - vs. Hamilton Tiger-Cats, Aug. 1, 1981
4 – Mike Pringle - vs. Ottawa Renegades, Aug. 29, 2004
3 – Mike King - vs. Calgary Stampeders, Sept. 23, 1950
3 – Damon Allen - @ Winnipeg Blue Bombers, Oct. 18, 1985
3 – Blake Marshall - vs. Calgary Stampeders, Sept. 8, 1989
3 – Tracy Ham - vs. BC Lions, Sept. 24, 1989
3 – Eric Blount - vs. Winnipeg Blue Bombers, Sept. 15, 1995
3 – Sean Millington - vs. Saskatchewan Roughriders, Oct. 30, 1999
3 – Mike Reilly - @ Saskatchewan Roughriders, Nov. 4, 2017
3 – Mike Reilly - vs. Calgary Stampeders, Sept. 8, 2018

Receiving

Most Receptions – Career
575 – Brian Kelly
545 – Terry Vaughn
496 – Fred Stamps

Most Receptions – Season
120 – Adarius Bowman – 
112 – Adarius Bowman – 
109 – Derel Walker – 2016
106 – Craig Ellis – 
106 – Terry Vaughn – 

Most Receptions – Season, Rookie
89 – Derel Walker - 
75 – Shalon Baker - 
73 – Kez McCorvey - 

Most Receptions – Game
15 – George McGowan – @ Saskatchewan Roughriders, Sept. 3, 1973 (249 yards)
15 – Darren Flutie – vs. Winnipeg Blue Bombers, Aug. 7, 1997 (231 yards)
14 – Fred Stamps – @ Hamilton Tiger-Cats, Sept. 16, 2011 (130 yards)
14 – Derel Walker – @ Hamilton Tiger-Cats, Aug. 21, 2015 (183 yards)

Most Receiving Yards – Career
11,169 – Brian Kelly
7,932 – Fred Stamps
7,681 – Terry Vaughn

Most 1000-YD Seasons - Career
6 – Brian Kelly - (-)
6 – Terry Vaughn - (-)
5 – Tom Scott - (-1983)
5 – Fred Stamps - (-)

Most Consecutive 1000-YD Seasons – Career
6 – Terry Vaughn - (-)
5 – Fred Stamps - (-)
4 – Tom Scott - (-)
4 – Craig Ellis - (-)

Most Receiving Yards – Season
1,812 – Brian Kelly - 
1,761 – Adarius Bowman - 
1,687 – Brandon Zylstra - 

Most Receiving Yards – Season, Rookie
1,156 – Shalon Baker - 
1,110 – Derel Walker - 
1,088 – Brian Kelly - 

Most Receiving Yards – Game
275 – Terry Vaughn - @ Winnipeg Blue Bombers, Aug. 13, 1999
266 – Brian Kelly - vs. Montreal Concordes, Oct. 15, 1983
249 – George McGowan - @ Saskatchewan Roughriders, Sept. 3, 1973

Longest Reception
108 – Vidal Hazelton from Mike Reilly - vs. BC Lions, July 28, 2017
105 – Jason Tucker from Ricky Ray - @ Winnipeg Blue Bombers, July 6, 2005
104 – Derel Walker from Mike Reilly - vs. Calgary Stampeders, Sept. 10, 2016

Most Touchdowns – Career
97 – Brian Kelly
59 – Jason Tucker
58 – Tom Scott

Most Touchdowns – Season
18 – Brian Kelly - 
17 – Craig Ellis - 
15 – Jim Sandusky - 
15 – Eddie Brown - 
15 – Kez McCorvey - 

Most Touchdowns – Game
4 – Brian Kelly - vs. Ottawa Rough Riders, June 30, 1984
4 – Kez McCorvey - vs. Winnipeg Blue Bombers, July 21, 2000

 Returns 
 Punt Returns

Most Punt Returns – Career
1,003 – Gizmo Williams
299 – Bayne Norrie
278 – Rollie Miles

Most Punt Returns – Season
118 – Tony Hunter - 
100 – Gary Hayes - 
98 – Gizmo Williams - 

Most Punt Returns – Game
12 – Gizmo Williams - @ Hamilton Tiger-Cats, Aug. 12, 1988
12 – Tony Hunter - vs. BC Lions, Sept. 24, 1989
11 – Leigh McMillan - vs. Saskatchewan Roughriders, Sept. 27, 1958
11 – Joe Hollimon - vs. BC Lions, Oct. 11, 1976
11 – Gregg Butler - @ Hamilton Tiger-Cats, Sept. 23, 1979
11 – Shalon Baker - vs. Hamilton Tiger-Cats, Aug. 23, 1996
11 – Winston October - vs. Winnipeg Blue Bombers, Oct. 17, 2003

Most Punt Return Yards – Career
11,177 – Gizmo Williams
2,819 – Winston October
2,190 – Larry Highbaugh

Most Punt Return Yards – Season
1,440 – Gizmo Williams - 
1,181 – Tony Hunter - 
1,124 – Gizmo Williams - 
1,077 – Gizmo Williams - 
987 – Gizmo Williams - 
964 – Gizmo Williams - 
963 – Kendial Lawrence - 

Most Punt Return Yards – Game
232 – Gizmo Williams - vs. Ottawa Rough Riders, July 17, 1991
221 – Gizmo Williams - vs. Calgary Stampeders, June 27, 1987
208 – Gizmo Williams - vs. Calgary Stampeders, Nov. 7, 1993
205 – Gizmo Williams - @ Toronto Argonauts, Aug. 9, 1995
205 – Tony Tompkins - @ Ottawa Renegades, July 21, 2005
164 – Shalon Baker - vs. Hamilton Tiger-Cats, Aug. 23, 1996

Longest Punt Return
116 – Larry Highbaugh - vs. Winnipeg Blue Bombers, Oct. 26, 1975
104 – Gizmo Williams - @ Hamilton Tiger-Cats, Aug. 12, 1992
104 – Gizmo Williams - vs. Calgary Stampeders, Nov. 7, 1993
101 – Winston October - vs. Hamilton Tiger-Cats, July 17, 2004

Most Touchdowns – Career
26 – Gizmo Williams
4 – Winston October
3 – Eddie Brown
3 – Tony Tompkins
3 – Tristan Jackson

Most Touchdowns – Season
5 – Gizmo Williams - 
4 – Gizmo Williams - 
4 – Gizmo Williams - 

Most Touchdowns – Game
2 – Gizmo Williams - vs. Calgary Stampeders, June 27, 1987
2 – Gizmo Williams - vs. Calgary Stampeders, Sept. 6, 1991
2 – Gizmo Williams - vs. Calgary Stampeders, Nov. 7, 1993

 Kickoff Returns 

Most Returns – Career
335 – Gizmo Williams
151 – Winston October
118 – Larry Highbaugh
118 – Joe Hollimon

Most Returns – Season
57 – Tony Tompkins - 
56 – Tristan Jackson - 
52 – Gizmo Williams - 

Most Returns – Game
8 – Joe Hollimon - vs. Calgary Stampeders, Oct. 31, 1976
8 – Gizmo Williams - @ Calgary Stampeders, Sept. 5, 1994
8 – Eric Blount - @ Calgary Stampeders, Sept. 4, 1995
8 – Donnie Ashley - @ Calgary Stampeders, July 22, 1999
8 – Jamal Miles - @ BC Lions, Oct. 25, 2013

Most Return Yards – Career
7,354 – Gizmo Williams
4,189 – Larry Highbaugh
3,173 – Winston October

Most Return Yards – Season
1,167 – Tristan Jackson - 
1,145 – Tony Tompkins - 
1,105 – Gizmo Williams - 

Most Return Yards – Game
239 – Joe Hollimon - vs. Calgary Stampeders, Oct. 31, 1976
228 – Stephan Jones - vs. Toronto Argonauts, Aug. 1, 1986
217 – Tyler Thomas - vs. Calgary Stampeders, September 6, 2014

Longest Return
118 – Larry Highbaugh - @ Winnipeg Blue Bombers, Oct. 17, 1976 (TD)
109 – Larry Highbaugh - vs. Winnipeg Blue Bombers, Oct. 26, 1975 (TD)
107 – Kendial Lawrence - @ Toronto Argonauts, Oct. 4, 2014 (TD)
105 – Jim Thomas (6)/Terry Swarn (99) - @ Winnipeg Blue Bombers, Sept. 20, 1970 (TD)
105 – Stephan Jones - vs. Toronto Argonauts, Aug. 1, 1986 (TD)

Most Touchdowns – Career
3 – Larry Highbaugh
2 – Kendial Lawrence
2 – Gizmo Williams

 Fumble Returns 

Most Returns – Career
26 – Willie Pless
23 – Rollie Miles
21 – Singor Mobley

Most Returns – Season
8 – Willie Pless - 
6 – Oscar Kruger - 
6 – John LaGrone – 
6 – Willie Pless - 

Most Returns – Game
3 – Willie Pless - vs. BC Lions, Oct. 16, 1992
3 – Willie Pless - @ Sacramento Gold Miners, Aug. 19, 1994

Most Return Yards – Career
266 – Singor Mobley
175 – Pete Lavorato
153 – Ron Howard

Most Return Yards – Season
129 – Singor Mobley - 
123 – Pete Lavorato - 
96 – Tyrone Walls - 

Most Return Yards – Game
95 – Ron Howard - vs. Toronto Argonauts, Sept. 12, 1987
92 – Terry Ray - vs. Toronto Argonauts, Sept. 26, 1999
79 – Jermaine Jones - @ Saskatchewan Roughriders, Sept. 29, 2001

Longest Return
95 – Ron Howard - vs. Toronto Argonauts, Sept. 12, 1987
92 – Terry Ray - vs. Toronto Argonauts, Sept. 26, 1999 (TD)

 Interceptions 

Most Interceptions – Career
66 – Larry Highbaugh
52 – John Wydareny
46 – Oscar Kruger

Most Interceptions – Season
11 – John Wydareny - 
11 – John Wydareny - 
11 – Darryl Hall - 
10 – Rollie Miles - 
10 – Larry Highbaugh - 
10 – Ed Jones - 

Most Interceptions – Game
3 - Steve Bendiak - @ Winnipeg Blue Bombers, Aug. 27, 1959
3 - Oscar Kruger - vs. BC Lions, Nov. 4, 1959
3 - John Wydareny - vs. Winnipeg Blue Bombers, Oct. 27, 1968
3 - John Wydareny - vs. Calgary Stampeders, Sept. 6, 1969
3 - Dick Dupuis - vs. Saskatchewan Roughriders, July 31, 1970
3 - Ed Jones - vs. Hamilton Tiger-Cats, Sept. 7, 1980
3 - Laurent DesLauriers - vs. Ottawa Rough Riders, June 30, 1984
3 - Danny Bass - @ Winnipeg Blue Bombers, Oct. 18, 1985
3 - Enis Jackson - vs. Saskatchewan Roughriders, Aug. 30, 1989
3 - Glenn Rogers - @ Hamilton Tiger-Cats, July 28, 1995
3 - Jason Goss - vs. Hamilton Tiger-Cats, Sept. 13, 2008

Most Return Yards – Career
770 – Larry Highbaugh
747 – John Wydareny
689 – Joe Hollimon

Most Return Yards – Season
300 – Robert Grant - 
263 – Malcolm Frank - 
228 – Joe Hollimon - 

Most Return Yards – Game
144 – Jason Goss - vs. Hamilton Tiger-Cats, Sept. 13, 2008
133 – Joe Burnett - @ BC Lions, July 20, 2012
127 – John Wydareny - @ Calgary Stampeders, Oct. 28, 1967

Longest Return
108 – Joe Burnett - @ BC Lions, July 20, 2012 (TD)
107 – John Wydareny - @ Calgary Stampeders, Oct. 28, 1967 (TD)
106 – Kavis Reed - vs. Saskatchewan Roughriders, Aug. 17, 1996 (TD)

Most Return Touchdowns – Career
7 – Joe Hollimon
6 – Malcolm Frank
5 – Cliff Toney
5 – Kavis Reed

Most Return Touchdowns – Season
5 – Malcolm Frank - 
4 – Joe Hollimon - 
3 – Ed Jones - 

Most Return Touchdowns – Game
2 – Ed Jones - vs. Hamilton Tiger-Cats, Sept. 7, 1980
2 – Jason Goss - vs. Hamilton Tiger-Cats, Sept. 14, 2008
2 – Dexter McCoil - vs. Toronto Argonauts, Aug. 23, 2014

 Quarterback sacks 

Most Sacks – Career
102 – Stewart Hill
75 - Bennie Goods
74 - Leroy Blugh

Most Sacks – Season
18.5 – James Parker – 
18 – Stewart Hill - 
18 – Stewart Hill - 
17.5 – James Parker - 
17 – Stewart Hill - 
17 – Stewart Hill - 
16 – Elfrid Payton - 

 Tackles 
 Defensive Tackles (statistics kept since 1987)''

Most Defensive Tackles – Career
813 – Willie Pless
646 – Larry Wruck
602 – Singor Mobley

Most Defensive Tackles – Season
130 – J. C. Sherritt - 
117 – Willie Pless - 
116 – Dan Bass - 
116 – Willie Pless - 

Most Defensive Tackles – Game
13 – Rod Davis - vs. Montreal Alouettes, Sept. 23, 2011
13 – T. J. Hill - vs. Montreal Alouettes, Oct. 5, 2013
12 – Willie Pless - @ BC Lions, Oct. 12, 1991
12 – Willie Pless - @ Saskatchewan Roughriders, July 7, 1995
12 – Willie Pless - @ Hamilton Tiger-Cats, July 28, 1995
12 – Singor Mobley - vs. Calgary Stampeders, Sept. 6, 1996
12 – Willie Pless - @ Montreal Alouettes, Oct. 4, 1998
12 – Singor Mobley - vs. Calgary Stampeders, Sept. 8, 2000
12 – A. J. Gass - vs. Calgary Stampeders, July 20, 2001
12 – Terry Ray - @ Saskatchewan Roughriders, July 19, 2002
12 – J. C. Sherritt - vs. Toronto Argonauts, Aug. 27, 2012
12 – Larry Dean - vs. Calgary Stampeders, Sept. 7, 2019

Special-Teams Tackles

Most Special-Teams Tackles – Career
163 – Jed Roberts
116 – Mike Miller
115 – Mathieu Bertrand

Most Special-Teams Tackles – Season
29 – Deon Lacey - 
27 – Mike Miller - 
25 – Bruce Dickson - 
25 – Corbin Sharun -

Tackles for Losses

Most Tackles for Losses – Career
41 – Willie Pless
31 – Bennie Goods
27 – Leroy Blugh

Most Tackles for Losses – Season
10 – Larry Wruck - 
8 – Terry Ray - 
8 – Damaso Munoz - 
8 – J. C. Sherritt - 2012

References 
Edmonton Eskimos Media Guide 2009
CFL website

Edmonton Elks lists
Canadian Football League records and statistics